Neverin is an Amt in the Mecklenburgische Seenplatte district, in Mecklenburg-Vorpommern, Germany. The seat of the Amt is in Neverin.

The Amt Neverin consists of the following municipalities:
 Beseritz
 Blankenhof
 Brunn
 Neddemin
 Neuenkirchen
 Neverin
 Sponholz
 Staven
 Trollenhagen
 Woggersin
 Wulkenzin
 Zirzow

Ämter in Mecklenburg-Western Pomerania
Mecklenburgische Seenplatte (district)